Ismail Dawood (born 23 July 1976, Dewsbury, West Yorkshire, England) is a former professional first-class cricketer, who later played for Cheshire County Cricket Club. He has previously played first-class cricket for Northamptonshire, Worcestershire, Glamorgan and Yorkshire.

Dawood is a lower-middle order batsman and wicket-keeper. He played in eight youth Test matches for England Under-19s scoring 240 runs, with a best of 111, at 21.81, and taking 16 catches and four stumpings. He first represented Northamptonshire in the Second XI Championship in 1994, and between 1997 and 1999 appeared extensively in the competition, in the interim playing irregularly in first-class cricket matches.

While with Glamorgan, Dawood showed that he was also a useful lower-order batsman and, in 1999, he recorded a maiden first-class hundred by making 102 against Gloucestershire at Cardiff, after being promoted to open the batting after injuries to other players. Later in the season, he also created a new county record by not conceding a bye as Lancashire totalled 556 for 6 declared at Blackpool.

In 39 first-class matches, Dawood scored 1,122 runs at 22 with a best of 102. He took 94 catches with six stumpings. In 51 one day matches he scored 732 runs at 21.52 with a top score of 60, taking 44 catches and making 14 stumpings. He played Twenty20 cricket in 2004 and 2005 for Yorkshire, scoring 44 runs at 8.80.

References

External links
Ismael Dawood at Cricket Archive

1976 births
English cricketers
English cricketers of 1969 to 2000
English cricketers of the 21st century
Living people
Herefordshire cricketers
Cheshire cricketers
Northamptonshire cricketers
Yorkshire cricketers
Worcestershire cricketers
Glamorgan cricketers
Cricketers from Dewsbury
British Universities cricketers